Beit Dagan (lit. It was awarded local council status in 1958.

History

During the Ottoman period, the area of Beit Dagan belonged to the Nahiyeh (sub-district) of Lod that encompassed the area of the present-day city of Modi'in-Maccabim-Re'ut in the south to the present-day city of El'ad in the north, and from the foothills in the east, through the Lod Valley to the outskirts of Jaffa in the west. This area was home to thousands of inhabitants in about 20 villages, who had at their disposal tens of thousands of hectares of prime agricultural land.

Beit Dagan was founded in 1948 at the site of the Palestinian village Bayt Dajan by Mizrahi Jewish immigrants from Yemen and North Africa. It is probably situated in the area of Biblical Beit Dagon, a village in the tribe of Judah (Joshua 15:41). Dagan, or Dagon, was also the name of an early semitic deity, and one of Dagans most important functions was guaranteeing abundant harvests of grain.

Climate
Beit Dagan is the home of the Israel Meteorological Service. 

Beit Dagan has a Mediterranean climate with hot and rainless summers, and with cold and rainy winters. Springs and autumns are cool to warm. Humidity is high during winter and low during summer, which makes summers rainless and hot, between average high of 30.8 °C (87.4 °F) and average low of 20.4 °C (68.7 °F). Winters are rainy and mild, between average high of 18.5 °C (65.3 °F) and average low of 7.6 °C (45.7 °F). Beit Dagan receives 550.5 mm (21.7 in) of precipitation per year and there are only 7 months of heavy rain.

Gallery

Transportation
Beit Dagan's main transportation hub is the Beit Dagan Junction, between highway 44 and route 412, serving as a bus terminal for lines to Rishon LeZion, Tzrifin, Ashkelon, Tel Aviv, Petah Tikva, Rehovot, etc.

The large Shapirim Interchange (intersection of Highway 1 and Route 412) is located on the northern side of town.

Notable residents
 Yam Madar (born 2000), Israeli professional basketball player

References

External links

 

Local councils in Central District (Israel)
Populated places established in 1948
1948 establishments in Israel